Space Soldiers is a themed anthology of science fiction short works edited by Jack Dann and Gardner Dozois. It was first published in paperback by Ace Books in April 2001. It was reissued as an ebook by Baen Books in July 2013.

The book collects nine novelettes and short stories by various science fiction authors, with a preface by the editors.

Contents
"Preface" (Jack Dann and Gardner Dozois)
"The Gardens of Saturn" (Paul J. McAuley)
"Soldiers Home" (William Barton)
"Legacies" (Tom Purdom)
"Moon Duel" (Fritz Leiber)
"Savior" (Robert Reed)
"Galactic North" (Alastair Reynolds)
"Masque of the Red Shift" (Fred Saberhagen)
"Time Piece" (Joe Haldeman)
"On the Orion Line" (Stephen Baxter)

References

2001 anthologies
Science fiction anthologies
Jack Dann and Gardner Dozois Ace anthologies
Ace Books books
Military science fiction